His Daughter is Called Peter (German: Seine Tochter ist der Peter) is a 1936 Austrian drama film directed by Heinz Helbig and Willy Schmidt-Gentner and starring Karl Ludwig Diehl, Traudl Stark and Paul Hörbiger. Stark was a child actor, considered a German-speaking answer to Hollywood's Shirley Temple.

The film was remade in 1955 with the same title.

Cast
 Karl Ludwig Diehl as Ingenieur Max Klaar 
 Traudl Stark as Elisabeth Klaar - known as Peter  
 Paul Hörbiger as Dr. Felix Sandhofer  
 Olga Tschechowa as Nora Noir 
 Maria Andergast as Kinga Gerold  
 Frida Richard as Kathi  
 Robert Valberg as General-Direktor Tarnay  
 Ekkehard Arendt as Baron von Lichtenstein  
 Richard Waldemar as Hotelportier 
 Therese Loewinger as Die Bodenseerin 
 Wilhelm Schich as Chauffeur 
 Hans Kammauf as Chauffeur
Paul Löwinger 
 Norbert Rohringer

References

Bibliography 
 Hake, Sabine. Popular Cinema of the Third Reich. University of Texas Press, 2001.

External links 
 

1936 films
Austrian drama films
1936 drama films
1930s German-language films
Films directed by Heinz Helbig
Films based on Swiss novels
Austrian black-and-white films